The Montevideo Uruguay Temple is the 103rd operating temple of the Church of Jesus Christ of Latter-day Saints (LDS Church).

History
Richard G. Scott, a member of the Quorum of the Twelve Apostles, who was one of the first Mormon missionaries in Uruguay, presided at the groundbreaking ceremony for the temple. The first LDS Church branch was organized in 1944 and since then the church has experienced phenomenal growth. By 2001, Uruguay had 73,000 members and a temple.

During the open house nearly 25,000 people visited the Montevideo Uruguay Temple. Among the visitors was Jorge Batlle, then President of Uruguay. LDS Church president Gordon B. Hinckley dedicated the Montevideo Uruguay Temple on 18 March 2001 with more than 6,500 people in attendance.

The temple has a single spire topped by a statue of the angel Moroni and the exterior is asa branca granite.

The Montevideo Uruguay Temple was the first temple of the LDS Church to be dedicated in the 21st century.

In 2020, the Montevideo Uruguay Temple was closed temporarily during the year in response to the coronavirus pandemic.

See also

 Comparison of temples of The Church of Jesus Christ of Latter-day Saints
 List of temples of The Church of Jesus Christ of Latter-day Saints
 List of temples of The Church of Jesus Christ of Latter-day Saints by geographic region
 Temple architecture (Latter-day Saints)
 The Church of Jesus Christ of Latter-day Saints in Uruguay

Additional reading
 
 "Montevideo Uruguay Temple Dedicated", Ensign, May 2001, p. 109

References

External links
 Official Montevideo Uruguay Temple page
 Montevideo Uruguay Temple at ChurchofJesusChristTemples.org

21st-century Latter Day Saint temples
Religious buildings and structures in Montevideo
Carrasco, Montevideo
Temples (LDS Church) completed in 2001
Temples (LDS Church) in Latin America
2001 establishments in Uruguay
American immigration to Uruguay
The Church of Jesus Christ of Latter-day Saints in Uruguay